Warren J. Hinkley (November 19, 1870November 29, 1933) was a Michigan politician.

Early life
Hinkley was born in Flushing, Michigan on November 19, 1870. Hinkley received an education in Flushing.

Career
On November 4, 1924, Hinkley was elected to the Michigan Senate where he represented the 13th district from January 1, 1925 to January 1, 1927. Hinkley was a Republican.

Death
Hinkley died in Flushing on November 29, 1933.

References

1870 births
1933 deaths
People from Genesee County, Michigan
Republican Party Michigan state senators
20th-century American politicians